David Creighton (April 1, 1843 – November 7, 1917) was an Ontario businessman and political figure. He represented Grey North in the Legislative Assembly of Ontario from 1875 to 1890 as a Conservative member.

He was born in Glasgow, Scotland in 1843; his parents were of Irish descent. Creighton came to Canada West with his family in 1855. He became editor and publisher of the Owen Sound Times in 1864, retiring in 1896. In 1873, he married Jane Elizabeth Kramer. He was first elected to the assembly in an 1875 by-election held after the election of Thomas Scott was declared invalid. He helped establish the newspaper The Empire at Toronto, which operated from 1887 to 1895. In 1895, Creighton was appointed assistant Receiver-General at Toronto.

The community of Creighton Mine, now a ghost town in Greater Sudbury, was named after him. He died in 1917.

References

External links 
The Canadian parliamentary companion and annual register, 1879, CH Mackintosh

The Canadian men and women of the time : a handbook of Canadian biography, HJ Morgan (1898)

1843 births
1917 deaths
Progressive Conservative Party of Ontario MPPs
British emigrants to pre-Confederation Ontario